Bostryx longispira is a species of  tropical air-breathing land snail, a pulmonate gastropod mollusk in the family Bulimulidae.

Distribution 

 Peru

This species appears to be locally abundant in Lima Region, Peru.

References
This article incorporates CC-BY-3.0 text from the reference 

Bulimulidae
Gastropods described in 1960